Sar Ziarat (also Romanized as Sar Zīārat) is a village in Adaran Rural District, Asara District, Karaj County, Alborz Province, Iran. At the 2006 census, its population was 249, in 76 families.

References 

Populated places in Karaj County